Benjamin Franklin Hilliker (May 23, 1843 – October 18, 1916) served in the Union Army during the American Civil War. He received the Medal of Honor.

Hilliker was born on May 23, 1843. He joined the 8th Wisconsin Infantry from Waupaca, Wisconsin in August 1861, and was discharged due to his wounds in August 1863. Hilliker died on October 18, 1916, and was buried at Hollywood Forever Cemetery in Los Angeles, California.

Medal of Honor citation
His award citation reads:

For extraordinary heroism on 4 June 1863, while serving with Company A, 8th Wisconsin Infantry, in action at Mechanicsburg, Mississippi. When men were needed to oppose a superior Confederate force Musician Hilliker laid down his drum for a rifle and proceeded to the front of the skirmish line which was about 120 feet from the enemy. While on this volunteer mission and firing at the enemy he was hit in the head with a minie ball which passed through him. An order was given to "lay him in the shade; he won't last long." He recovered from this wound being left with an ugly scar.

See also

 List of Medal of Honor recipients

Notes

External links
 

1843 births
1916 deaths
People from Waupaca, Wisconsin
Military personnel from Wisconsin
People of Wisconsin in the American Civil War
Union Army soldiers
United States Army Medal of Honor recipients
People from Erie County, New York
American Civil War recipients of the Medal of Honor
Burials at Hollywood Forever Cemetery